Masters of Chant Chapter II is the third album by Gregorian.

Original track listing

 "Moment of Peace" (featuring Sarah Brightman) (original by Gregorian) (4:22)
 "The First Time Ever I Saw Your Face" (Ewan MacColl) (original by Peggy Seeger) (6:00)
 "In the Air Tonight" (Phil Collins) (original by Phil Collins) (5:45)
 "Bonny Portmore" (Celtic traditional) (5:02)
 "Hymn" (John Lees) (original by Barclay James Harvest) (6:07)
 "Child in Time" (Ritchie Blackmore, Ian Gillan, Roger Glover, Jon Lord, Ian Paice) (original by Deep Purple) (5:20)
 "Everybody's Got to Learn Sometime" (James Warren) (original by The Korgis) (5:19)
 "Wish You Were Here" (David Gilmour, Roger Waters) (original by Pink Floyd) (5:32)
 "Lady D'Arbanville" (Cat Stevens) (original by Cat Stevens) (4:46)
 "Heaven Can Wait" (Jim Steinman) (original by Meat Loaf) (5:53)
 "Babylon" (text from Psalm 137) (original by Don McLean) (3:05)
 "Stairway to Heaven" (featuring Amelia Brightman) (Jimmy Page, Robert Plant) (original by Led Zeppelin) (8:05)

French, Belgian and Portuguese bonus tracks

<li>"Voyage Voyage" (featuring Sarah Brightman) (Dominique Dubois, J. Michael Rivat) (original by Desireless) (3:57)
<li>"Rêver" (Laurent Boutonnat, Mylène Farmer) (original by Mylène Farmer) (5:00)
<li>"Instant de Paix (Moment of Peace)" (featuring Amelia Brightman) (4:00)
<li>"Moment of Peace (Portuguese version)" (featuring Amelia Brightman) (4:00)
<li>"Moment of Peace (Spanish version)" (featuring Amelia Brightman) (4:00)

Japanese bonus tracks

<li>"Breathe" (John Mallory, Leigh Nash, Michelle Tumes) (original by Sixpence None the Richer) (3:53)
<li>"Make Us One" (Cindy Morgan, Michael W. Smith) (original by Cindy Morgan) (3:15)

Chart performance

Weekly charts

Year-end charts

Certifications and sales

References

2001 albums
Covers albums
Gregorian (band) albums